East Troy may refer to:

Places
United States
 East Troy, Maine, a village
 East Troy, Pennsylvania, an unincorporated community
 East Troy, Wisconsin, a village
 East Troy (town), Wisconsin, a town

High schools
United States
 East Troy High School, East Troy, Wisconsin

Railroads
United States
 East Troy Electric Railroad, a heritage railroad operating passenger excursions on a 7-mile stretch of track from East Troy, Wisconsin to Mukwonago, Wisconsin